San Pedro Creek, a stream in Val Verde County, Texas, formerly a tributary of Devils River. It is now flows into the east side of Amistad Reservoir at an elevation of 1135 feet.

The mouth of San Pedro Creek where it entered the Devils River, was at the place of the First Crossing of Devils River by the San Antonio-El Paso Road.

See also
List of rivers of Texas

References

Rivers of Texas
Devils River (Texas)
Rivers of Val Verde County, Texas
Tributaries of the Rio Grande